The 2008–09 Scottish Premier League season was the eleventh season of the Scottish Premier League and the second season under the sponsorship of the Clydesdale Bank. It began on 9 August 2008 with a game between Falkirk and Rangers.
After the 33rd round of matches, the league split in half and each team played a further five matches against the teams in their half of the league.

Champions Rangers qualified directly for the Champions League, while second-placed Celtic qualified for the qualifying rounds. Four teams qualified for the new Europa League: Hearts and Aberdeen via league position, Falkirk via the Scottish Cup, and Motherwell by the Fair Play initiative. Inverness were relegated after their fifth season in the SPL and were replaced by St Johnstone for the following season's competition.

The championship was determined on the final day of the season. Leaders Rangers travelled to Tannadice to play Dundee United knowing that a win would secure the title. They achieved this comfortably, courtesy of a 3–0 victory. The goals were scored by Kyle Lafferty, Pedro Mendes and the league's top goalscorer, Kris Boyd. Celtic needed to win their final match of the season against Hearts and hope that Rangers failed to win, but their goalless draw was rendered meaningless. It was also Rangers first title in 4 years.

Clubs

Promotion and relegation from 2007–08
Promoted from First Division to Premier League
 Hamilton Academical

Relegated from Premier League
 Gretna

Stadia and locations

Personnel and kits

Managerial changes

Events

 8 August – Former SPL members and Scottish Cup finalists Gretna are formally liquidated by the club's administrators
 3 January – St Mirren drew 0–0 with Motherwell in their last game at Love Street before they moved to New St Mirren Park
 31 January – St Mirren drew 1–1 with Kilmarnock in their first match at their new stadium
 2 May – St Johnstone won promotion to the Scottish Premier League as First Division champions following a 3–1 win over Greenock Morton
23 May – Inverness Caledonian Thistle were relegated after losing 1–0 to Falkirk at the Caledonian Stadium

League table

Results

Matches 1–22
During their first 22 matches, each team played every other team home and away.

Matches 23–33
During matches 23–33 each team played every other team once (either at home or away).

Matches 34–38
During matches 34–38 each team play every other team in their half of the table once.

Top six

Bottom six

Goals

Top scorers

Last updated: 24 May 2009Source: BBC Sport

Hat-tricks

Attendances

Awards

Monthly awards

Clydesdale Bank Premier League Awards

References

Scottish Premier League seasons
1
Scot